Cranfillia geniculata, synonym Blechnum geniculatum, is a fern in the family Blechnaceae. The specific epithet refers to the geniculate (sharply bent) base of the sterile fronds.

Description
The plant is a terrestrial or lithophytic fern. The creeping rhizome has dense apical scales. Its fronds are 10–25 cm long and 7–15 cm wide.

Distribution and habitat
The fern is endemic to Australia's subtropical Lord Howe Island in the Tasman Sea. It grows on moist, shaded banks in cloud forest on the summits of Mounts Gower and Lidgbird, where it is rare.

References

Blechnaceae
Endemic flora of Lord Howe Island
Plants described in 1993
Ferns of Australia